The YUBA B League was the second-tier level men's professional club basketball competition in FR Yugoslavia, later Serbia and Montenegro. Founded in 1992 and folded in 2006, it was run by the Basketball Federation of Serbia and Montenegro.

History

Yugoslavia (1992–2003)

Serbia and Montenegro (2003–2006) 
Serbia Group

Montenegro Group

Predecessor and successors 
Predecessor 
  Yugoslav First B Federal League (1980–1992)
Successors 
  Second Basketball League of Serbia (2006–present)
  Montenegrin Second League (2006–present)

References 

Defunct basketball leagues in Europe
Basketball leagues in Serbia and Montenegro
Sports leagues established in 1992
Sports leagues disestablished in 2006
1992 establishments in Yugoslavia
1992 establishments in Montenegro
1992 establishments in Serbia
2006 disestablishments in Serbia and Montenegro